Risca and Pontymister railway station is a station on the Ebbw Valley Railway in south-east Wales. It serves the village of Pontymister and the town of Risca. It is located roughly ½ mile south of the original Risca railway station.

The station is located near Ty Isaf School and Mill Street on a site of former railway sidings. The station has two platforms and a park and ride car park. Vehicular access to the station is off Maryland Road, with passenger access off Mill Street.

Services
On Sundays, the hourly Cardiff to Ebbw Vale service runs via Newport.

History

The first steam locomotive passenger train ran on the Monmouthshire Railway and Canal Company Western Valley line on Monday 23 December 1850, with service running twice in each direction (to Ebbw Vale and to Newport) each weekday.

The MRCC had been running the canals and horse-drawn carriages on their tram-roads which went through Risca from 1795.

Passenger services on the original line ended in 1962.

References

External links

Planning Approval Granted for New Railway Station
Archive of Ebbw Valley Railway Scheme website (Blaenau Gwent council, 2008)

Railway stations in Caerphilly County Borough
DfT Category F2 stations
Railway stations opened by Network Rail
Railway stations in Great Britain opened in 2008
Railway stations served by Transport for Wales Rail